Wiemer is a German language surname. It stems from a reduced form of the male given name Wigmar – and may refer to::
Daniel Wiemer (1976), German actor
Jason Wiemer (1976), Canadian retired professional ice hockey forward
Jim Wiemer (1961), Canadian former professional ice hockey defenceman
Robert Wiemer (died 2014), American film and television director, writer, producer and editor

References 

German-language surnames
Surnames from given names